Malo Ioane Luafutu, also called Jeshua Ioane Luafutu (born on 29 May 1979), and better known by his stage name Scribe, is a New Zealand rapper of Samoan descent. He achieved two solo number ones on the singles chart from his debut album, The Crusader, which was released in 2003 in New Zealand and later certified four times platinum. He also reached number one as a featured artist on P-Money's 2004 song "Stop the Music", and in 2010 on R&B singer J.Williams' single "You Got Me".

Career 
With the initial focus on the song "Stand Up", director Chris Graham gave the video for the single the energy of a rock video. He invited music guests, DJs and even the general public to participate in the video. The song debuted at number 6 on the New Zealand top 40 singles chart and soon rose to number 1. The single spent 12 (non-consecutive) weeks at number one.

Dirty Records released Scribe's debut album The Crusader in New Zealand in October 2003 with distribution through Festival Mushroom Records. The album went gold within hours and platinum within days. It sold 60,000 copies in New Zealand, which is four times platinum status in that country.

Scribe followed the success of the album with the limited-edition release of "Not Many – The Remix!" featuring guest vocals from MCs Savage and Con Psy which peaked at No. 2. He then released a new single, "Dreaming" in January 2004; this also reached No. 1.

Scribe took a break from new singles and toured the country on the Hook It Up tour before he returned in late 2004 with a new single off P-Money's Magic City album called "Stop the Music", again reaching No. 1.

In 2005 he opened for the Beastie Boys at shows in Australia.

After a decade hiatus, Scribe released a single titled Non Attachment which will feature on the forthcoming album Scribe is Dead, due for release in 2023.

Rhyme Book 
Scribe's second studio album, titled Rhyme Book, was released by Scribe in Australia on 29 September 2007 and in New Zealand on 1 October 2007. Rhyme Book did not sell as well as its predecessor. It featured collaborations with New York hip-hop artist Talib Kweli (of Reflection Eternal and Black Star fame) on the track "Be Alright".

The first single off the album in New Zealand, "My Shit", had its video premiere on 12 August 2007 on local music channel C4. "F.R.E.S.H." was the second single released in New Zealand. The first single in Australia however was "F.R.E.S.H.", followed by "My Shit". The third single in both countries, "Say It Again", features Scribe's cousin Tyra Hammond.

Personal struggles and addictions
In 2011, in an interview on Campbell Live, Scribe described how he became addicted to drugs, alcohol and gambling between 2005 and 2007 following lacklustre sales of his second album, Rhyme Book. His addiction led to his family denying him access to money. He decided to pawn off the platinum awards he had won with his debut album.

In November 2011 Scribe was arrested in Wellington for disorder and released after being formally warned. Scribe said his arrest was illegal, but admits he was "dissing" the police, but "their ego couldn't handle it".

Following the assault on cricketer Jesse Ryder in late March 2013, Scribe took to Twitter, implying that Ryder was somehow responsible because his behaviour was not "humble" enough for someone visiting Christchurch. He further noted that "Cantabrians don't beat people up for no reason." Scribe's comments were widely vilified on Twitter and numerous blogs with many posters alluding to Scribe's role in the violent, unprovoked assault on Phil Armstrong in 2004 as further evidence that he condones violence. Ryder later jokingly thanked Scribe for his "support".

In August 2018, Scribe was imprisoned for two months after breaching his curfew and performed in Motueka. He was released on 29 October. He was later due in court on 13 December for methamphetamine possession and breach of protection order.

Christchurch earthquake
Scribe released a remix of his single "Not Many" to show support for the victims of the 2011 Christchurch earthquakes. "Not Many Cities" features Scribe rapping in different parts of the CBD's red zone, with altered lyrics such as "I don't know any city" instead of "I don't know anybody". Although his video received positive attention from the media, there was outcry from some Christchurch residents who claimed it was unfair that Scribe was allowed in the red zones when red zone business owners were not.

Shortly after the remix's release, Scribe announced that he was working on a third album, as yet unreleased. It is to be titled Therapy.

Family
Scribe is the cousin of other prominent Samoan New Zealand musicians Ladi6 and Tyra Hammond of The Opensouls. His father is Fa’amoana John Luafutu who wrote the 2022 film called A Boy Called Piano directed by Nina Nawalowalo. Scribe's brother Matthias Luafutu is an actor. Scribe, Matthias and their father John also collaborated with Tom McCrory and Nina Nawalowalo on the stage play A White Guitar in 2015, which was an autobiographical story that did a eight-city sold out tour in 2016.

Discography

Studio albums

Major album guest appearances
 P-Money – Big Things (2002) (six songs)
 Concord Dawn – Uprising (2003) (one song)
 P-Money – Magic City (2004) (three songs)
 P-Money – Everything (2010) (three songs)

Singles

As featured artist

References

External links
AudioCulture
 Festival Music Records New Zealand artist page
 
 

1979 births
APRA Award winners
New Zealand people of Samoan descent
New Zealand rappers
Pacific Music Award-winning artists
Living people
People educated at St Paul's College, Auckland
People educated at Linwood College